Joaquín Capilla Pérez (December 23, 1928 – May 8, 2010), was a Mexican diver who won the largest number of Olympic medals among Mexican athletes. Together with his elder brother Alberto he competed in the 3 m springboard and 10 m platform at the 1948, 1952 and 1956 Olympics and won one gold, one silver and two bronze medals, finishing fourth in the two remaining competitions. He also won four medals at the Pan American Games, in 1951 and 1955. After retiring from competitions Capilla descended into poverty, chain smoking and alcoholism, eventually losing his family and home. He recovered owing to religion and later earned a degree in theology. In 2009 he was awarded the National Sports Award. He died the next year in 2010 as a result of cardiac arrest, at the age of 81.

References

1928 births
2010 deaths
Mexican male divers
Swimmers from Mexico City
Olympic divers of Mexico
Olympic gold medalists for Mexico
Olympic silver medalists for Mexico
Olympic bronze medalists for Mexico
Divers at the 1948 Summer Olympics
Divers at the 1952 Summer Olympics
Divers at the 1956 Summer Olympics
Olympic medalists in diving
Medalists at the 1956 Summer Olympics
Medalists at the 1952 Summer Olympics
Medalists at the 1948 Summer Olympics
Pan American Games gold medalists for Mexico
Pan American Games medalists in diving
Divers at the 1955 Pan American Games
Divers at the 1951 Pan American Games
Medalists at the 1951 Pan American Games
Medalists at the 1955 Pan American Games